Eddie Pellagrini Diamond at John Shea Field was a baseball stadium in Chestnut Hill, Massachusetts. It was the home field of the Boston College Eagles baseball team from 1961 to 2017. The stadium held 1,000 people and was named after Commander John Joseph Shea, USN, a former football player (1916–1917) at Boston College, who died on September 15, 1942, when the aircraft carrier USS Wasp was torpedoed and sunk during the Guadalcanal Campaign in World War II. In 1997, the diamond was named for Eddie Pellagrini, head coach of the Eagles for 31 years and the coach of the team when the field opened in 1961.

Shea Field was also home to many tailgaters during home football games at the adjacent Alumni Stadium.

The Boston College baseball team played its final game at Shea Field on May 20, 2017. The team moved to a new baseball stadium, on nearby Brighton Campus, in spring 2018. Boston College's new Athletics Field House, an indoor practice facility for football and other varsity and intramural sports, is currently being constructed on the site of the former Shea Field. It is expected to open in August 2018.

See also
 List of NCAA Division I baseball venues

References

External links
Pellagrini Diamond at Shea Field

1961 establishments in Massachusetts
2017 disestablishments in Massachusetts
Boston College Eagles baseball venues
Baseball venues in Boston
Defunct baseball venues in Massachusetts
Defunct sports venues in Boston
Defunct college baseball venues in the United States
Sports venues completed in 1961
Sports venues demolished in 2017